Macromia tillyardi is a species of dragonfly in the family Macromiidae,
known as the Australian cruiser. 
It is a large, black to metallic green dragonfly with bright yellow markings on its abdomen, clear wings and long legs.
It is found in northern Australia,
where it inhabits streams and pools.

Taxonomic history
Robin Tillyard collected the type specimen of Macromia tillyardi in 1905 and passed it onto René Martin for publication in his about-to-be-published work on Cordulines, in Collections zoologiques du baron Edm. de Selys Longchamps.

 Three females of this magnificent insect were taken by me at Kuranda, N.Q., in January, 1905. As M. René Martin is about to issue his work on the Corduliinae, it seems fitting that the record and description of so fine a species should appear in his new work. I have therefore sent him my description of the insect together with the type-specimen. It will be sufficient in this paper to give a short description only, so that the insect may be recognised by Australian collectors (Tillyard, 1906)

Tillyard wrote his description and published it in November 1906,
several months before Martin's work was published on 17 January 1907.

Gallery

See also
 List of Odonata species of Australia

References

Macromiidae
Odonata of Australia
Insects of Australia
Endemic fauna of Australia
Taxa named by René Martin
Insects described in 1906